Housing stress describes a situation where the cost of housing (either as rental, or as a mortgage) is high relative to household income.  It may also be used to describe inadequate housing for a proportion of the population.

As a rule of thumb, a household spending 30 per cent or more of its income can be considered under housing stress, and under "extreme" housing stress if spending exceeds 50 percent.  Other studies may apply a different threshold, or restrict its definition to households with below average income.  The Economic Research Service of the United States Department of Agriculture classifies counties as under housing stress" if 30 percent or more of its housing units meets one or more of the following criteria: lacked complete plumbing, lacked complete kitchens, paid 30 per cent or more for owner costs or rent, or had more than one person per room.

References

Renting
Affordable housing